John Evans Montague (born September 12, 1947), is a former professional baseball pitcher. He played for the Montreal Expos, Philadelphia Phillies, Seattle Mariners and California Angels of Major League Baseball (MLB) in parts of seven seasons spanning 1973–1980. He was born in Newport News, Virginia.

Career
Montague attended Newport News High School and played college baseball at Old Dominion University, was selected by the Chicago White Sox in the 15th round of the 1965 Major League Baseball Draft, but decided not to sign with the team. He was then selected by the Baltimore Orioles in the 3rd round of the 1967 amateur draft. On April 13, 1973, the Orioles sent him to the Montreal Expos in exchange for Mickey Scott.

He made his major league debut for the Expos on September 9, 1973 against the New York Mets, pitching the eighth inning of a game the Expos lost by a score of 3-0, and retiring all three batters he faced. He appeared in three games in relief in 1975 in his brief stint with the Phillies.

He was purchased by the Seattle Mariners on November 6, 1976 from the Phillies. As a member of the Mariners' inaugural team, he earned the first save in team history, preserving a 5-1 win against the California Angels at the Kingdome on April 9, 1977, pitching a scoreless eighth and ninth inning and giving up only one walk (erased on a double play). Montague started the  season with the Mariners, and had a 6-4 record and one save in 41 appearances with the club.

He was traded by the Mariners on August 29, 1979 to the California Angels for a player to be named later, a trade completed when the Angels sent Jim Anderson to the Mariners on December 5, 1979. He ended the 1979 season with a 2-0 record and six saves in 14 relief appearances.  was his final season in the major leagues, ending his career with a 4-2 record and three saves in 37 appearances, all in relief. The final game of his career was on August 28, 1980, giving up nine hits and six runs (all earned) in a two-inning relief appearance in a 13-8 loss to the Baltimore Orioles.

References

External links

1947 births
Living people
American expatriate baseball players in Canada
American expatriate baseball players in Mexico
Baseball players from Virginia
California Angels players
Criollos de Caguas players
Florida Instructional League Orioles players
Liga de Béisbol Profesional Roberto Clemente pitchers
Major League Baseball pitchers
Memphis Blues players
Mexican League baseball pitchers
Miami Marlins (FSL) players
Montreal Expos players
Navegantes del Magallanes players
American expatriate baseball players in Venezuela
Oklahoma City 89ers players
Old Dominion Monarchs baseball players
Peninsula Whips players
Philadelphia Phillies players
Rieleros de Aguascalientes players
Rochester Red Wings players
Seattle Mariners players
Tiburones de La Guaira players
Tigres del México players
Vaqueros de Bayamón players
Sportspeople from Newport News, Virginia